Radio Killer was a Romanian dance/pop and eurodance music group. Their debut single was released in 2009 and is called "Voila". It was the most broadcast song in Romania and Russia of that year. The name "Radio Killer" comes from the fact that "radio killer" means "hit" in US slang; Radio Killer plans for all its songs to be hits.

They have had songs chart in countries including Germany, Italy, Spain, England, France, Russia, Slovenia, Greece, and Switzerland and even got a first place in the UK charts and won an award for "Best New Act" in the 2010 Romanian Music Awards. Their single "Calling You" was the first song by a Romanian DJ project to be in the BBC Radio One playlist. Their song "Is It Love Out There" is the official anthem for the Liberty Parade, the biggest street dance event in Romania.

Members 

Smiley

Born 27 July 1983 in Pitești), real name Andrei Tiberiu Maria, Smiley is singer, songwriter, composer and record producer. He was part of the band Simplu and has developed a solo career. In 2013, he won "Best Romanian Act" during the MTV Europe Music Awards held in Amsterdam. He had been nominated as a solo act three times for the same award in 2008, 2009 and 2011 and twice in 2006 and 2007 as part of Simplu. He is also a television personality having hosted Românii au talent for four consecutive seasons (2011-2014) and being a coach in Vocea României also for three consecutive seasons (2011-2013).

EleFunk
Real name Serban-Ionut Cazan

Paul Damixie

Paul Damixie is  years old, and is the DJ of Radio Killer. In March 2016, Damixie won the Remix Award in Miami for his remix of Adele's "Hello".

Crocodealer
Real name Alex Velea

DJ CellBlock
DJ CellBlock (Rares Mititean, 11 aprilie 1985, Bistrița, România) is a DJ, Music Producer and Mixing Engineer known for his collaborations with Codu' Penal :ro:Codu%27 Penal and HaHaHa Production.

Discography 

Credits - Co/Productions

Smiley (singer) feat. Alex Velea & Don Baxter - Cai verzi pe pereți

Smiley - Acasã

Anda Adam - Dacã are fi

Loredana Groza - Apa feat. Cabron

Smiley feat. Alex Velea - Dincolo de cuvinte

Cabron - Letz be friends

Anda Adam - Amo

Loredana feat. Alex Velea, Cabron & Radu Mazăre - Viva Mamaia

Alex Velea - Când noaptea vine

Cabron - Iarna pe val feat. What's Up & Iony

Cabron - PaRap
Karie

Boogie Man
Real name: Don Baxter

Lee Heart
Lee Heart (b. Catalina Ciobanu, 3 May 1990, Bucharest, Romania) is a young dance artist from Romania and also the voice of Radio Killer. At only 17 years old she had performed on stage with The Black Eyed Peas at their concert in Romania in September, 2007.

Discography 
Singles
 Voila , 2009
 Be Free, 2010
 Lonely Heart, 2010
 Don't Let the Music End, 2011
 Calling You, 2012
 Is It Love Out There, 2012
 You and Me, 2012
 Middle of the Night, 2013
 Raise Me Up, 2013
 Beautiful People, 2013
 Perfect Day, 2013
 Kill the Lights, 2014
 Living It Up, 2014
 It Hurts Like Hell, 2015

References

External links 
Official site

Romanian dance musical groups
Musical groups established in 2009
2009 establishments in Romania
Musical groups from Bucharest